The Welwyn Hatfield Borough Council elections, 2012 were held to elect council members of Welwyn Hatfield Borough Council, the local government authority of Welwyn Hatfield, Hertfordshire, England.

The elections were contested in 16 of the 17 wards. In each ward, one seat was up for election. Welham Green was not contested as it is represented by two councillors and 2012 was not an election year.

Wards contested

The 16 wards contested in the Welwyn Hatfield Borough Council elections were:

 Brookmans Park & Little Heath
 Haldens
 Handside
 Hatfield Central
 Hatfield East
 Hatfield South
 Hatfield Villages
 Hatfield West
 Hollybush
 Howlands
 Northaw and Cuffley
 Panshanger
 Peartree
 Sherrards
 Welwyn East
 Welwyn West

Election summary

Ward results

Brookmans Park & Little Heath

Haldens

Handside

Hatfield Central

Hatfield East

Hatfield Villages

Hatfield South

Hatfield West

Hollybush

Howlands

Northaw & Cuffley

Panshanger

Peartree

Sherrards

Welwyn East

Welwyn West

References

External links
Welwyn Hatfield Council

2012 English local elections
2012
2010s in Hertfordshire